Maurizio Guarini is a self-taught keyboardist, multi-instrumentalist and composer, best known as a member of the progressive rock band Goblin.

Biography
Born in Rome, Italy in 1955, Guarini started playing organ and guitar at the age of 10. He started playing live at high school concerts with some rock bands. Later, his music exploration moved on to progressive / jazz-rock. After graduating from high school in 1973, he attended the Math faculty at the University La Sapienza in Rome.

In spring 1975 Massimo Morante from Goblin invited Guarini to join the band, just after Deep Red was released. Starting with the very first concert in September 1975, Goblin, that reached top of the charts at that time, kept touring Italy until the end of 1976.
In March 1976 Goblin released the album Roller.

Just after three days of recording of the score for the movie Suspiria, on November 23, 1976, Guarini temporarily left the band. Late in 1978, after two years of studio work mainly in studio at RCA Records in Rome, Guarini re-joined Goblin, with a different line-up. Production of the band in the following years includes scores for the movies Patrick (1978), Buio Omega (1979), Contamination (1980), St.Helene's (1981), Notturno (1983) and the non-movie related album Volo]' (1982).

In parallel, during this years, Guarini collaborated with other musicians, mainly with the Italian composer Fabio Frizzi, and performed as session musician in several scores, mostly for movies directed by Italian director Lucio Fulci: The Beyond, City of Living Dead, Zombi 2 and others. Still about film scoring, in 1984 Maurizio started a cooperation with the Italian Composer Pino Donaggio, with whom he collaborated on 25 soundtracks.

Other non movie-related activities up to 1990 include collaborations with Italian artists, in studio production and in live concerts.

In 1993 Guarini earned a bachelor's degree in Computer Science.

In November 1998 Guarini and his wife moved to Toronto, Canada, and for a few years worked mainly in software development.

In 2003 former Goblin bandmates Massimo Morante and Fabio Pignatelli contacted Guarini with the idea to restart the dormant Goblin.
The new band, under the name BackToTheGoblin, worked two years to realize the new album BackToTheGoblin 2005, released at the beginning of 2006, with the Canadian independent label BackToTheFudda.

In 2007 Guarini founded a trio with Great Bob Scott and Chris Gartner, former members of the Canadian band Look People. The band, named Orco Muto, played live in Canada, mostly performing revisited Goblin tunes, with the addition of some original compositions.

In 2009 Goblin started a European tour, but in December the band split again. In March 2010 Guarini and Morante asked the original founder Claudio Simonetti to re-join the band, and founded New Goblin, with a new line-up. New Goblin started a World tour that included Europe, Japan and Australia, and released two live albums recorded in Rome and in Tokyo in 2011.

Guarini released his first solo album, Creatures from a Drawer, in January 2013

Guarini has recently begun work on new material for his follow up record to 2013's Creatures from a Drawer.

Guarini was invited by legendary French progressive rock ensemble MAGMA to support and showcase live the world premiere of his new group MAURIZIO GUARINI CIRCLE in Toronto, Canada on April 2, 2016, at The Opera House. More plans for Canadian, U.S., Japanese and European festival appearances are in development.

Discography

Solo albums
2013 Creatures from a Drawer

Goblin
 2015	Four of a Kind 2012	Live in Roma 2012	Two Concerts in Tokyo (DVD)
 2006	BackToTheGoblin 1983	Notturno 1982	Volo 1981	St. Helens 1980	Contamination 1979	Buio Omega 1979	Patrick 1977	Suspiria 1976	Roller 1976	ChiGuest appearances and additional discography
 
 Various Artists - Prog Exhibition 2 (live with Goblin/Steve Hackett) 2012
 Samsas Traum – Anleitung Zum Totsein 2011
 Enzo Carella -	Carella De Carellis	1992	+ arrangements
 Patty Pravo -	Oltre l'Eden	1989	+ arrangements
 Grazia Di Michele -	L'amore e' un pericolo	1988	+ arrangements
 Lucio Quarantotto -	Ehi la'	1986	+ arrangements
 Franco Bracardi -	Bracardevolmente	1986	+ arrangements
 Patty Pravo -	Occulte persuasioni/Per una Bambola	1984 + arrangements
 Nada -	Noi non cresceremo mai	1984
 Anna Maria Nazzaro -	Anna Maria Nazzaro	1984	
 Scialpi -	Estensioni	1983
 Adriano Pappalardo -	Oh! Era ora	1983	
 Renato Zero -	Calore	1983
 Massimo Morante -	Esclusivo	1983	
 Nada -	Smalto	1983
 Piero Finà -	Indeformabile	1982 	
 Beppe Dati -	Beppe Dati	1982
 Massimo Morante -	Corpo a corpo	1982	
 Gianni Togni -	Le mie strade	1981
 New Perigeo -	Effetto Amore	1981
 Edoardo De Angelis -	Anche meglio di Garibaldi	1980	
 Martine Michellod - 	Martine M. and the BVD' ensemble	1979	
 Rita Pavone -	RP '80	1979
 Starter -	Pole Position	1979	
 Enzo Carella -	Barbara e altri Carella	1979 + arrangements
 Antonello Venditti -	Buona Domenica	1979
 Dario Farina -	Destinazione Tu	1979
 Riccardo Cocciante -	E io Canto	1979	+ arrangements
 Enrico Simonetti -	Gamma	1975

Other collaborations in studio production
 Lucio Battisti
 Gianni Morandi
 Mia Martini
 Maurizio Giammarco
 Perigeo
 Camaleonti
 Alunni del sole
 Bruno Lauzi
 Goran Kuzminac
 Mario Zanotelli
 Alberto Macario
 
 Don Backy
 Ivan Graziani
 Sergio Caputo
 Gino Santercole
 Daniela Davoli
 Rokko
 Tony Esposito
 Sammy Barbot
 Donato Ciresi
 Gianni Bedori

Film Scores

As Goblin
 The Solitude of Prime Numbers 2010 (Saverio Costanzo)- opening titles 
 Notturno 1983 (Giorgio Bontempi)
 St. Helens 1981 (Ernest Pintoff)
 Contamination 1980 (Luigi Cozzi)
 Patrick 1979 (Richard Franklin)
 Buio Omega 1979 (Joe D'Amato)
 Martin 1977 (George A. Romero)
 Suspiria 1976 (Dario Argento)

Other soundtrack work as performer or composer
- Tophet Quorum (Profane Exhibit) 2013 (S.Stivaletti) - work in progress
- The Phantom of the Opera 1998 (Dario Argento, E.Morricone) composer of additional music only
- Il Portaborse 1991 (Daniele Luchetti, Dario Lucantoni) Kb
- Indio 1989 (Antonio Margheriti, P.Donaggio) Kb
- La partita 1988 (Carlo Vanzina, P.Donaggio) Kb
- Zelly and Me 1988 (Tina Rathborne, P.Donaggio) Kb
- Kansas 1988 (David Stevens, P.Donaggio) Kb
- Don Camillo 1988 (Therence Hill, P.Donaggio) Kb
- Catacombs 1988 (David Schmoeller, P.Donaggio) Kb
- Qualcuno in ascolto a.k.a. - High Frequency 1988 (Faliero Rosati, P.Donaggio) Kb
- The Barbarians 1987 (Ruggero Deodato, P.Donaggio) Kb
- Phantom of Death - a.k.a. Un delitto poco comune 1987 (Ruggero Deodato, P.Donaggio) Kb
- Appointment with Dead 1988 (Michael Winner, P.Donaggio) Kb
- Sette chili in sette giorni 1987 (Luca Verdone, P.Donaggio) Kb
- Dancers 1987 (Herbert Ross, P.Donaggio) Kb
- My African Adventure 1987 (Boaz Davidson, P.Donaggio) Kb
- Scirocco 1987 (Aldo Lado, P.Donaggio) Kb
- Jenatsch 1987 (Daniel Schmid, P.Donaggio) Kb
- Renegade 1987 (E.B.Clucher, M.Paoluzzi) Kb
- Crawlspace 1986 (David Schmoeller, P.Donaggio) Kb
- L'inchiesta a.k.a. - The Inquiry 1986 (Damiano Damiani, R.Ortolani) Kb
- La monaca di Monza a.k.a. - Devils of Monza 1986 (Luciano Odorisio, P.Donaggio) Kb
- Murder Rock - Dancing Death 1986 (Lucio Fulci, K.Emerson) Additional kb
- Il caso Moro 1986 (Giuseppe Ferrara, P.Donaggio) Kb
- Hotel Colonial 1986 (Cinzia Th. Torrini, P.Donaggio) Kb
- Sotto il Vestito niente 1985 (Carlo Vanzina, P.Donaggio) Kb
- The Beyond aka - L'aldila 1983 (Lucio Fulci, F.Frizzi) Kb
- Conquest 1983 (Lucio Fulci, C. Simonetti) voice effects only
- Hercules 1983 (Luigi Cozzi, Pino Donaggio) kb
- Segni particolari: bellissimo 1983 (Franco Castellano, Gino Santercole) kb
- Zombi 2 a.k.a. - Zombie 1980 (Lucio Fulci, F.Frizzi) Kb
- The Gates of Hell (City of the living Dead) 1980 (Lucio Fulci, F.Frizzi) Kb
- White Pop Jesus 1980 (Luigi Petrini, Bixio/Tempera) Kb
- Schock 1977 (Mario Bava, Libra) Kb
- Gamma (TV)'' 1975 (Salvatore Nocita, E.Simonetti) Kb

Theatre works
Macbeth (Vittorio Gassman, mus. G.Gazzola)
Amleto (Gabriele Lavia, mus. Carnini)

Live Music
 2013–present Goblin
 2012 New Goblin
 2011 New Goblin
 2010 New Goblin
 2009 apr - jul Goblin
 2008 aug - oct Orco Muto (trio)
 2007 aug - oct Goblinia (trio)
 1990 nov - dec Nini Rosso, Japan
 1989 may - jun Mario Castelnuovo
 1988 jul - sep Luca Barbarossa
 1987 apr - sep Mimmo Locasciulli
 1986 sep - oct Renato Zero
 1986 jan - mar Patty Pravo
 1985 dec - dec Patty Pravo
 1985 jul - sep Fiorella Mannoia
 1984 apr - jun Patty Pravo
 1982 jul - sep Riccardo Cocciante + New Perigeo
 1982 jan - mar Luca Barbarossa
 1981 nov - dec Luca Barbarossa
 1980 jul - oct Alberto Fortis
 1979 apr - nov Riccardo Cocciante
 1978 jul - aug Francesco De Gregori
 1976 jan - nov Goblin
 1975 sep - dec Goblin
 1974 nov - dec Loy & Altomare

References

External links
 Official website
 Maurizio on Imdb
 BackToTheGoblin Official website
 New Goblin Official website

1955 births
Italian composers
Italian male composers
Italian keyboardists
Progressive rock keyboardists
Living people
Musicians from Rome